Ivan Lykke Henriksen (born 8 October 1946) is a Danish former footballer who played as a goalkeeper for B.1901 Nykøbing and Fremad Amager. He made two appearances for the Denmark national in 1975.

References

External links
 
 

1946 births
Living people
Danish men's footballers
Association football goalkeepers
Denmark international footballers
Fremad Amager players
Nykøbing FC players